Slow It Down may refer to:

 "Slow It Down" (East 17 song), 1993
"Slow It Down" (Amy Macdonald song), 2012
"Slow It Down", a 2013 song by The-Dream from IV Play
"Slow It Down", a 2017 song by Kim Petras
"Slow It Down", a 2018 song by Charlie Puth from Voicenotes